Restaurant Bären Münsingen is a traditional inn founded in 1371 and located in Münsingen, Bern canton, Switzerland. It is one of the oldest Swiss taverns and the recent wooden building is from 16th century.

At that time there was a post office and a place for "Postkutscher" (post coachmen) to change their horses.

See also 
List of oldest companies

References

External links 
Homepage in German
Facebook page
Reviews on TripAdvisor.

Hotels in Switzerland
Restaurants in Switzerland
Companies established in the 14th century
14th-century establishments in Switzerland